The Mazda3 (known as the Mazda Axela in Japan (first three generations), a combination of "accelerate" and "excellent") is a compact car manufactured by Mazda. It was first introduced in 2003 as a 2004 model, replacing the Familia/323/Protegé in the C-segment.

The second-generation Mazda3 for the 2009 model year was unveiled in late 2008, with the sedan premiering at the Los Angeles Auto Show and the hatchback at the Bologna Motor Show. For the 2012 model year, Mazda began offering the Mazda3 with their newly developed Skyactiv technology, including a more rigid body, a new direct-injection engine, and a new 6-speed transmission.

The third generation was introduced in mid-2013 as a 2014 model year. The third-generation model is the first Mazda3 to adopt the "Kodo" design language and a more complete Skyactiv range of technologies.

The fourth-generation Mazda3 for the 2019 model year was unveiled in November 2018 at the Los Angeles Auto Show. For the 2019 model, the all-new Mazda3 is equipped with the updated Skyactiv technologies, including a spark-controlled compression ignition engine marketed as the Skyactiv-X.

A performance-oriented version of the Mazda3 was marketed until 2013 as the Mazdaspeed3 in North America, Mazdaspeed Axela in Japan, and the Mazda3 MPS in Europe and Australia.

The Mazda3 became one of Mazda's fastest-selling vehicles, with cumulative sales in January 2019 of over 6 million units.



First generation (BK; 2003) 

The BK series Mazda3 was first unveiled at the 60th Frankfurt Motor Show on 10 September 2003, and launched in Japan in October 2003 as the Axela. The model was well received by the automotive press for its performance, handling, styling and interior, with some describing it as feeling like a more expensive sports sedan/saloon despite its value-oriented price.  Some criticisms have included fuel economy and crash test results (only receiving four out of a maximum five stars from the Euro NCAP Safety Testing Programme) the latter of which was rectified by making six airbags standard. In 2006, the Mazda3 was the second best-selling car in Canada and the best selling car in Israel during 2005–2007.

Design 
The Mazda3 is based on the Ford global C1 platform, shared with the latest European Ford Focus and Volvo S40. Previewed by the MX-Sportif concept car, the first-generation Mazda3 was available in two body styles, a four-door fastback sedan/saloon, marketed as a "4-door coupé style" in Europe, and a five-door hatchback, branded the Sport version in Canada, Japan, and the United States. Design work began under chief designer Hideki Suzuki in 1999 at three Mazda design centres in California, United States; Frankfurt, Germany; and Hiroshima, Japan. By 2001, Hasip Girgin's design was chosen as a finalist. Girgin was sent to work in Hiroshima for 6 months, after which the final design was frozen for scheduled 2003 production.

The front suspension comprises MacPherson struts, with coil springs and an anti-roll bar. The rear suspension is a Ford-designed "E-link" multi-link suspension, with four locating links per wheel and an anti-roll bar, suspended on coil springs that are mounted inboard of the shock absorbers to reduce suspension intrusion into the cargo area. The first generation Mazda3 has been known to have spontaneous piston failure in the form of the piston itself cracking which is a result of manufacturing anomalies that has plagued a small percentage of the normally reliable car. Four-wheel Disc brakes are fitted, with  discs in the front and  discs in the rear; ABS and electronic brake force distribution are available as standard, depending on the model. Wheel and tire sizes vary with model, from 15" on base models to optional 17" wheels on upper-level models. The Mazda3 was used as a regular police patrol car by the Public Security Police Force of Macau alongside the Toyota Corolla and the Honda Civic police cars in Macau, China.

When first introduced, United States-market Mazda3 models were available in only two trim levels, i and s, with the 2.0 L and 2.3 L engines, respectively. Since then Mazda has introduced additional models under the Touring and Grand Touring labels. British Mazda3s are offered in S, TS, TS2, Sport, and a top end 2.3 L turbocharged Mazda3 MPS (Mazda Performance Series) models. Since April 2008, when there was a mainly cosmetic facelift of the Mazda3, there have been some changes to the trim designations for UK cars, with the models now being the entry-level S, then Takara (which replaces TS & TS2), the Tamara Special Edition and the Sport and MPS as before.

All three models use the inline-4 Mazda MZR engine, with various types, displacements and outputs including the MZ-CD turbo-diesel, depending on model and market. Transmissions are a five-speed manual transmission and a four-speed automatic transmission; since the 2006 model year, a five-speed automatic is optional on models with the 2.3 L engine. This transmission has now been made standard on the 2.0 L engine in Japan (FWD models only), as part of a minor facelift in early 2008 which includes different front/rear bumper designs, new wheel designs and body colors, stiffened chassis, and better interior materials. The MPS / Mazdaspeed version is only available with a six-speed manual.

Engines 
The Mazda3 features the following engines:

Japanese market (JIS ratings):
 1.5 L: , 
 2.0 L: , 
 2.3 L: , 

European market (ECE ratings):
 1.4 L: , 
 1.6 L: , 
 2.0 L: , 
 2.3 L MZR DISI Turbo: , 
 1.6 L MZ-CD common-rail diesel: , 
 2.0 L MZR-CD common-rail diesel: , 
 2.2 L MZR-CD common-rail diesel: , 

American & Canadian markets (SAE net ratings):
 2.0 L: , 135 lbf·ft (183 N·m) (04–05) PZEV engine:  (04–06),  (07–); 132 lbf·ft (179 N·m) (all years)
 2.3 L: , 150 lbf·ft (203 N·m) PZEV engine: , 149 lbf·ft (202 N·m) (2006 only)
 2.3 L MZR DISI Turbo: Mazdaspeed3: , 280 lbf·ft (380 N·m)

Mazda changed the rating for US & Canadian markets 2007 2.3 L naturally aspirated engine:
 2.3 L: , 150 lbf·ft (203 N·m) PZEV engine: , 149 lbf·ft (202 N·m) (07–)

Asian markets (DIN ratings):
 1.6 L: , 107 lbf·ft (145 N·m)
 2.0 L:  and 138 lbf·ft (187 N·m)

Australian market (ADR net ratings):
 2.0 L: , 134 lbf·ft (182 N·m)
 2.3 L: , 150 lbf·ft (203 N·m)
 2.3 L: DISI MZR: , 280 lbf·ft (380 N·m)
 2.0 L MZR-CD common-rail diesel: , 

South African market (DIN net ratings):
 1.6 L: , 108 lbf·ft (146 N·m)
 2.0 L: , 134 lbf·ft (182 N·m)
 2.3 L: , 150 lbf·ft (203 N·m)
 2.3 L: DISI MZR: , 280 lbf·ft (380 N·m)

Performance 
Wheels magazine reported an 8.7-second 0–100 km/h time for the Australian 2.0 model in its May 2004 issue.

The 1.6 CiTD 80 kW diesel (as sold in Europe) with a five-speed manual does  in 11.6 seconds and has a top speed of  according to the official Mazda specifications.

Car and Driver documented the acceleration of a 2007 Mazda3 four-door sedan.

2006 
The automatic transmission used in the S trim Mazda3 with the 2.3-liter engine was changed from a four-speed to a five-speed design. The larger engine was now PZEV-certified (Partial Zero Emissions Vehicle) for vehicles sold in California and other states that have adopted California automotive emission standards. The smaller engine had already been PZEV-certified. The color palette was also simplified in 2006, with the deletion of Canary Yellow and Lava Orange Mica.

2007 
The 3 received a minor cosmetic facelift for the 2007 model year with minimal exterior, interior and mechanical changes. On base models, the black plastic at the top of the grille became body-coloured. The front fascia and bumper were changed with a floating foglight design and the lower air intake opening was reshaped to better resemble the typical "Mazda five-point face." All Mazda3 sedans and five-doors gained the same "Axela" clear-lens style rear tail-lights as the SP23 model, which in 2007, Mazda brought out the Mazda Axela similar to the Mazda6 Atenza. In addition, the Grand Touring trim also featured LED brake lights. The LED brake lights were added to compete with the growing trend of higher-end vehicles using LED tail lamps for more visible light output. The range of alloy wheels were redesigned, featuring a 17-inch alloy wheel for the Grand Touring version. The rear fascia was slightly changed adding a notch on the bumper cover of the sedan. Several new exterior colors were added, phantom blue, a copper red metallic (April 2008), Aurora Blue and dark cherry. The Titanium Gray color was replaced with a darker Galaxy Gray color.

The interior of the Mazda3 was offered with several new color choices and an audio jack in the centre console, allowing the use of digital music players. Also, Takara models, which were introduced in the 2008 upgrade, added climate control and 6-CD autochanger to the TS specification.

The 2007 model also includes less visible mechanical changes. The keyless entry system was improved. Reinforcements to the body shell improve overall chassis rigidity. The front dampers of the MacPherson strut suspension have been re-tuned to quicken steering response and reduce understeer. The hydraulic dampers of the multi-link rear suspension were also re-tuned to match the front suspension changes. Mazda engineers and designers addressed concerns regarding cabin noise level by redesigning or changing multiple systems and adding sound-deadening material to the roof lining and hood panel.

The bumper-to-bumper warranty was reduced to 36 months / 36,000 miles while the powertrain warranty was increased to 60 months / 60,000 miles in most markets. In the UK, all Mazda3s have a 3-year unlimited mileage warranty, 3-year roadside assistance and 12 year anti perforation warranty as standard.

Canadian Mazda3s received standard seat-mounted side-airbags and body-shell-mounted side-curtain airbags across the model range. Previously, both airbag types were not available.

2008 
An additional trim level included the Sport GX with a 2.0 L engine, previously all Sport hatchbacks had a 2.3 L engine and came only in GS or GT trims. Compared to the GX sedan, the GX hatchback has body-coloured door handles, and fog lamps. Options for the Sport GX include air conditioning, a convenience package containing power accessories and 15-inch alloys, and a rear trunk spoiler.

The GS sedan received standard 16-inch alloy wheels, previously only available with the moonroof option, while the GX had 15-inch alloy wheels added to the convenience package (which includes steering-wheel mounted audio controls, power windows, power locks, and remote entry). The GS hatchback now comes with factory-installed air conditioning. GT models received standard xenon headlights, previously part of the leather package.

In the U.S., the i Touring trim level was replaced by the i Touring Value model. This new model added a body-color front grille, fog lights and 17" alloy wheels, giving it a very similar appearance to the more expensive s models. The interior also received leather-covered steering wheel and shift knob from the s model. Anti-lock brakes and side-impact airbags, previously optional, were now standard.

2009 
Initial news reports indicated the 2009 model year would receive a minor facelift by the end of the year with exterior design modifications that included chrome door handles, a new roof spoiler, expanded use of black moldings on the rear bumper, and new alloy-wheel options. This turned out to not occur in the US or Canadian market. The 2009 model year was only a few months long as production ceased in November 2008.

Philippines 
In the Philippines, the BK3 replaced the (BH) 323 in 2004. It has three grades, "1.6S", "1.6V &" 2.0R". The "1.6V" is powered by Mazda's 1.6L inline-four engine mated to a 4-speed automatic transmission respectively. It came with four speakers and 6 CD audio system, central locking among other features. The top spec "2.0R" is powered by Mazda's 2.0L MZR engine mated to a 4 speed automatic transmission with activematic. It came with side skirts, sunroof, remote keyless entry, immobilizer & leather interior.

In 2007, the entry level "1.6S" received a minor update. Updates includes new gauge clusters, cloth seats & door linings, MP3 ready sound system, and a redesigned grill.

Australia 
In Australia, the BK 3 replaced the 323 (BJ) in January 2004. The original iteration came in several guises, "Neo", "Maxx", "Maxx Sport" and "SP23". The base "Neo" guise came with remote central locking, a four speaker sound system with a CD Player among other features. Building upon the Neo, the "Maxx" offered power windows and mirrors, alloy wheels, remote keyless central locking, six speakers and an in-dash sound system. The "Maxx Sport" added primarily cosmetic features, with that including a body kit, front fog lamps and larger alloy wheels. The "SP23" gained a larger engine as well as other smaller luxury features.

In July 2006, Mazda introduced its Series II 3. Updates included refreshed front and rear light fixtures, as well updated alloy wheels and a new fog light configuration. A high performance "MPS" Hatch was introduced into the lineup within this update.

The 3 continuously sold well throughout the BK generation, reaching 4th in Australian sales within 2006. The following table lists sales throughout its tenancy.

Second generation (BL; 2008) 

 
In development from 2004 and designed under Kunihiko Kurisu from early 2005 to August 2006, in November 2008 Mazda debuted the second-generation Mazda3 with restyled exterior. Two engines were offered in the US and Canadian markets, the 2.0 L petrol engine offered in the previous generation and a new 2.5 L inline-four shared with the second-generation Mazda6.

The C1 architecture, a collaboration of Ford, Mazda, and Volvo,  is carried over from the previous generation though marginally wider, longer and lighter than the previous generation. In other markets, more engines are offered including a new 2.2 L turbo-diesel engine.

2010 
Mazda unveiled the 2010 Mazda3 sedan/saloon at the Los Angeles Auto Show on 19 November 2008. The second-generation Mazda3 is slightly larger than the older Mazda3 and was available in "i" and "s" versions. The "i" (GX or GS in Canada) is powered by a  2.0 L engine while the "s" (GT in Canada) is powered by a  2.5 L engine adapted from the Mazda6. Both engines are also available in PZEV versions in the US, the 2.0 L producing  and the 2.5 L producing . The 3s Grand Touring trim level adds leather seats, power driver's seat, rain-sensing windshield wipers, dual-zone automatic climate control, and steerable active bi-xenon headlights as standard equipment. The hatchback was unveiled a few weeks after the sedan/saloon at the Bologna Motor Show.

The European model includes a start-stop system with the 2.0L DISI engine with an estimated increase fuel economy in city cycle by roughly 12%.

Mazdaspeed3

Full details and images of the high-powered Mazdaspeed3 (known as the Mazda3 MPS in Europe or Mazdaspeed Axela in Japan) were released at the Geneva Motor Show in March 2009. Like the previous generation, the Mazda3 hatchback variant has been selected as the basis for the second generation Mazdaspeed3.

2012 update
The 2012 Mazda3 with Skyactiv powertrain was unveiled at the Canadian International Auto Show in Toronto, February 2011. It comes with Mazda's Skyactiv-G 2.0-liter, direct-injection gasoline engine, and Skyactiv-Drive 6-speed automatic or Skyactiv-MT 6-speed manual transmission. The chassis rigidity was increased with the use of additional high tensile steel most significantly in the center floor pan and B-pillar where reinforcement was extended 7 inches. Additionally, Mazda increased the number of spot welds to join suspension crossmembers to improve handling and stability. There are minor exterior updates: revised grille and air intakes, and a reshaped rear valance panel. Skyactiv models receive a blue ring around the projectors in the headlamps. Car and Driver reported that such a Mazda3 can reach estimated EPA fuel-economy ratings of 30 mpg city and 39 to 40 highway.

Engines

Third generation (BM/BN; 2013) 

The third-generation 2014 Mazda3 was revealed in Australia on 26 June 2013. It now sits atop the new Skyactiv chassis, no longer sharing the Ford C1 platform. It is the third vehicle to adopt the Mazda's 'Kodo' design language, after the CX-5 and the Mazda6.

It has a drag coefficient (Cd) of 0.26 for the sedan/saloon, slightly higher for the hatchback. Combined with the Skyactiv technology, this produces a rating from the U.S. EPA of  city and  highway for the 2-litre sedan, and one less mpg highway for the 5-door hatchback.

Initially the 6-speed manual gearbox was only for the 2.0-litre cars, and automatic transmission was standard on the 2.5, or available for the 2.0. In its first-drive review of the 2014 Mazda3, the auto enthusiast weblog Jalopnik stated that "once the 2.5 comes with a manual transmission, there is really no reason to buy anything else in this class."

2015 
For the 2015 model year in North America, the 2.5-litre cars are also offered with manual gearbox. Model grades for the U.S. market are SV (2.0 Sedan only), Sport (2.0 Sedan & Hatchback), Touring, and Grand Touring (available in all body styles with either engine). The 2014 model ranked number one among Affordable Small Cars in U.S. News & World Report's rankings. In the 2014 Canadian Car of the Year rankings Mazda3 was chosen as the Best New Small Car. Canadian magazine The Car Guide chose Mazda3 as the Best Compact Car in its Best Buys car rankings for 2015 and 2016.

In Europe, three Skyactiv-G (gasoline) engines are offered, one 1.5L and two 2.0L (at two different power ratings); and a 2.2L Skyactiv-D (Diesel) engine is available. Availability of hatchback and sedan/saloon body styles and their combinations with engines varies amongst European markets. In 2014, the Mazda3 made it to the finals of the European Car of the Year competition. For the UK market, the Mazda3 Sedan was marketed as a fastback.

Thailand models of Mazda3 went on sale on 18 March 2014.

A concept version of the Mazda3, with an engine powered by compressed natural gas, was unveiled in 2013 at the Tokyo Motor Show.

In Malaysia, the third-generation Mazda3 was first launched in March 2014 fully imported from Japan and was available with a sole 2.0L sedan variant. In April 2015, locally assembled versions of the Mazda3 became available for purchase. In April 2017, the facelift version was launched with 3 offerings, the Sedan GL, Sedan High and Hatchback.

Mazda3 Skyactiv-Hybrid
The Mazda3 Skyactiv-Hybrid is a version of the Mazda3 with Skyactiv-G 2.0 engine with 14:1 compression and electric-petrol drive. The vehicle was unveiled at the 2013 Tokyo Motor Show.

Production
Taiwan models of the Mazda3 were produced by Ford Lio Ho Motor Co., Ltd.

Production of the US market Mazda3 sedan at Mazda de Mexico Vehicle Operation (MMVO) in Salamanca, Guanajuato began on 7 January 2014, as the factory's first production vehicle model.

As of 22 January 2014, cumulative production of the Mazda3 production reached four million units since June 2003.

Production of Thailand market Mazda3 at AutoAlliance (Thailand) Co., Ltd. (AAT) began on 14 March 2014. Within months of release, the 3 was the 15th best-selling car in Thailand.

2016/2017 facelift 
The facelifted model of the Mazda3 was introduced in August 2016, bearing the BN model code. Changes include a new dashboard layout, new front and rear exterior styling (the latter, only in the hatchback), new first-of-its-kind G-Vectoring Control and the removal of the diesel engine option. Safety and driver assistance features were also improved, adding a traffic sign-recognition sensor and pedestrian detection with the pre-collision braking system.

This facelift debuted in North America for the 2017 model year. In the United States, the "i" and "s" monikers were dropped, leaving the Sport (2.0), Touring (2.5), and Grand Touring (2.5) trim levels.

Powertrain

Fourth generation (BP; 2019) 

The fourth-generation Mazda3 hatchback and sedan were both unveiled at the 2018 Los Angeles Auto Show on 28 November 2018, and global sales began in early 2019, as the 2019 model year in North America. The model was previously previewed by the Kai Concept, first shown in October 2017. With the release of the 4th generation model, the "Axela" nameplate was no longer used in the Japanese domestic market as part of Mazda's standardized global naming structure.

The exterior design of the sedan and hatchback models are heavily differentiated, with both models only sharing the hood and headlights, while front wing fenders and front doors are designed uniquely for each body styles. Its body uses an increased amount of ultra-high-strength steel 980 MPa or higher to 30 percent of the vehicle body, an increase over the 3 percent in the prior generation.

Mazda has swapped the more sophisticated multilink independent rear suspension from its predecessor for a cheaper and more compact torsion beam setup which is claimed to improve the car's quietness, along with the added sound deadening materials. To enhance the vehicle's NVH, Mazda included a 'two-wall' structure that leaves space between the body and carpeting on the floor. The model is also equipped with an updated version of the torque vectoring system marketed as the G-Vectoring Control Plus.

Interior materials are upgraded with a stitched dash pad, metal trim for the climate control knobs and central infotainment controller, a new steering wheel design, and a newly developed 8.8-inch display screen with a redesigned Mazda Connect system interface. A dark red leather upholstery color is offered for the hatchback model.

In North America, the Mazda3 has all-wheel drive an available option for the first time.

Production of the model in Thailand at the AutoAlliance Thailand in Rayong started on 28 August 2019.

Engine and transmission 

The 1.5-, 2.0- and 2.5-liter versions of the current Skyactiv gasoline engine line is offered, as well as the 1.8-liter Skyactiv-D diesel engine. Transmission options consist of the 6-speed Skyactiv-MT manual and the Skyactiv-Drive automatic. Initial release in North America only included the 2.5-liter petrol engine.

Mazda introduced an all-wheel drive version of the 2.5-liter turbocharged gasoline engine for model year 2021 which is exclusively mated to a six-speed automatic transmission. In the Australian market, the fourth-generation Mazda3 along with the CX-30 are available with the e-SkyActiv G MHEV engine, for improved acceleration and fuel economy.

Safety
The Mazda3 has disc brakes on all wheels.

IIHS
The 2022 Mazda3 was tested by the IIHS and received a Top Safety Pick+ award:

Motorsports 

 The Mazda3 was introduced to the Speed World Challenge in 2009.
 Team Sahlen entered a Mazda3 in the Continental Tire Sports Car Challenge Street Tuner class in 2010.
 Mazda South Africa, in conjunction with MFC (a vehicle finance house) entered two Mazda3 MPS models into Class-T of the South African Production Car Championship from 2007 to 2010.
 Mazda3 is used in the seed category NASCAR Stock V6 Series in Mexico.
 The 2020 Mazda3 TCR program was announced in October 2019 but canceled in August 2020 due to the COVID-19 pandemic.

Sales

References

External links 

 (sedan)
 (hatchback)

3M
Compact cars
Hatchbacks
Sedans
Ford C1 platform
Front-wheel-drive vehicles
Euro NCAP small family cars
2010s cars
2020s cars
Cars introduced in 2003
Partial zero-emissions vehicles
Cars powered by transverse 4-cylinder engines